Kimberly Chambers (born January 11, 1974) is an American retired pornographic actress.

Career
She entered the adult film industry in 1993 at the age of around 19 and has since performed in over 200 films. She has also directed at least four films. Chambers picked her stage name as an homage to Marilyn Chambers, whom she met when she was 16 years-old.

In 2002, she appeared with her then-husband Scott Styles, whom she married in 1998, and Ron Jeremy in an infomercial for a male enhancement product called ExtenZe. She also appeared as herself on Ricki Lake in 2002 with her then husband. She retired as an adult performer in 2008.

Since leaving the adult industry, Chambers has been a professional figure competitor and has given advice on sex, health, and fitness with columns in Marie Claire, American Curves, and Muscle Mayhem. Chambers also released a DVD called "Kimflex: Behind the Scenes", which featured nude workouts and erotic dancing. She has also hosted a weekly "Ask a Porn Star" segment on KBPI's "The Uncle Nasty Show" broadcast in Denver, Colorado.

Awards

 1994 XRCO Award winner – Best Anal Sex Scene (Butt Banged Bicycle Babes) with Yvonne, Mark Davis & John Stagliano
 2001 FOXE Award winner – Female Fan Favorite
 2002 AVN Award winner – Best Solo Sex Scene (Edge Play - VCA Pictures)

References

External links

 
 
 
 

1974 births
Living people
American pornographic film actresses
American pornographic film directors
Pornographic film actors from California
Women pornographic film directors
Actresses from Fullerton, California
Film directors from California
Fitness and figure competitors
21st-century American women